Avatar Singh Cheema (1933–1989) was the first Indian man and sixteenth person in world to climb Mount Everest. Along with 8 others he was a part of the third mission undertaken by the Indian Army, in 1965, to climb Mount Everest after two failed attempts.
The Indian Everest Expedition 1965 put 9 mountaineers on the summit on 20 May, a record that lasted 17 years, and was led by  Captain M S Kohli. Cheema's fellow summiters were Nawang Gombu, Sonam Gyatso, Sonam Wangyal, Chandra Prakash Vohra , Ang Kami, H. P. S. Ahluwalia, Harish Chandra Singh Rawat and Phu Dorjee. He was a captain in the 7th Bn Parachute regiment at that time. Later he was promoted to colonel. He is also founder of Guru Harkrishan Public School in Sri Ganganagar District, Rajasthan.

Honors and awards 
He was awarded the Arjuna award  and Padma Shri for his achievements.

References

See also
Indian summiters of Mount Everest - Year wise
List of Mount Everest records of India
List of Mount Everest records
List of Mount Everest summiters by number of times to the summit

Indian summiters of Mount Everest
Indian mountain climbers
Indian Army officers
Recipients of the Padma Shri in sports
Recipients of the Arjuna Award
People from Sri Ganganagar district
1933 births
1989 deaths
Military personnel from Rajasthan
Indian Sikhs